Spanish hip hop is a subgenre of music which consists of hip hop music produced in Spain. Spanish hip hop is directly influenced by hip hop music from the United States, Latin America, and some European countries, including France and the United Kingdom. Spanish hip hop has an international audience, and Latin American migration to Spain has also influenced the hip hop produced in the country, and has led to the growth of reggaeton.

The hip hop culture in Spain is often socially conscious, and has a strong presence on working-class barrios, but it is not limited to these. Hip hop in Spain is strong in cities like Madrid, Barcelona, Zaragoza, Seville and Málaga.

Its sound is directly inspired by the major hip hop styles in the United States (East Coast, South, Northern and West Coast), but it incorporates influences from flamenco or rumba (for example, with artists like Solo los Solo, or La Mala Rodríguez), or Latin music in the use of loops and samples.

It uses Spanish as a main language for their lyrics, but it is not unusual to hear it mixed up with fully formed English-language sentences, slang words, spanglish, or English-spoken samples on their productions.

Spanish hip hop also cultivates good relationships with the dancehall / reggae culture, and there is frequent collaboration between artists from both musical worlds.

Spanish public radio currently features two long-lasting Hiphop radio shows: La Cuarta Parte and El Rimadero, broadcasting national and international hip hop daily and weekly.

After some early examples of Spanish hip hop, by groups like The Mean Machine in the late 1970s, hip hop music spread through Spain during the first half of the 1980s, via
 skate culture, graffiti and the breakdance,
 plays on several radio shows (for example Radio 3 with "La radio de las mil danzas"), night clubs (Stone's, in Madrid, or Studio 54 in Barcelona), music stores (Disco J.L., New Record, Rayfield Singleton)
 films (Beat Street, Breakdance)
 imported vinyl and cassettes.

The American military base of Torrejón de Ardoz (including its radio station) is often cited as one of the places from which hip hop music started to leak into Spanish society.

History
In 1989, the record label Troya Dscs&Rcrs released the first Spanish hip hop LP titled Madrid Hip Hop, which was a compilation of four bands from the province of Madrid: DNI, Estado Crítico, Sindicato del Crimen and QSC. The record presented two cuts of each band.

Later in 1989, the major label Ariola had a campaign to establish some hip hop stars with a new compilation of Madrilene hip hop music titled Rappin Madrid and introduced more soloists and groups, such as MC Randy & D.J. Jonco.

These attempts had limited success, but did help to establish a viable hip hop scene in Madrid.

During the 1990s there was a gradual expansion, and underground hip hop reached many listeners over the decade.

In Barcelona, some notable groups include 7 Notas 7 Colores, Elements, Dilema, Kunta K, Pachecos, Christian Crisis, and Chacho Brodas among others.

In Valencia, notable groups include Fill Black, Choco Bros, (Johnny Doc, Àngel, Jackobo Hernández), Los Chikos del Maiz, Asturias (Johnny Fontane, Gee Malee, Urban P.) and Málaga (Hablando en Plata Squad, Elphomega, Triple XXX, and Jefe de la M).
  
In Seville, notable groups include Andalusia, Poetas Sureñas, SFDK (made up of Zatu and Acción Sánchez), Dareysteel, Tote King, Shotta, Jesuly, Dogma Crew, and Juaninacka. Seville has been a significant growth area for Spanish-language hip hop rappers in Spain in recent years.

In Zaragoza, the most known groups are Violadores del Verso and Rapsusklei.

Spain also has a number of high-profile artists who are introducing Spanish hip hop music to the United States like DJ Jooz, who has released mixtapes with artists such as Ace Hood, Trae, and Rasheeda. He is a member of Slipe-N-Side Records and is the most important and active hip hop DJ from Spain.

There are producers like Slash Major, who introduced Trap to Spain and who works with F.L.Y. (Fast Life Yungstaz), Kirby, Waka Flocka Flame, and Roscoe Dash. Other producers include Cookin' Soul and Torrico, who produced one of Juelz Santana's biggest hits, "Days of our lives".

Notable songs 

 
Hip hop